Frigoribacterium faeni is a psychrophilic bacterium from the genus Frigoribacterium which has been isolated from hay dust from Finland.

References

Microbacteriaceae
Bacteria described in 2000